Lemonora was a British Thoroughbred racehorse owned by Joseph Watson, 1st Baron Manton (1873-1922). Ridden by Joe Childs he won the Grand Prix de Paris on 26 June 1921, one mile seven furlongs, beating a large field, with a prize of 400,000 French Francs (about £16,830) then the world's most valuable racing prize. Just 26 days before on 1 June 1921 he came third in the Derby, having in early May come second in the Classic 2000 Guineas at Newmarket. In 1920 he won the Champagne Stakes at Doncaster and came second in the  Gimcrack Stakes at York. His subsequent breeding career was disappointing as he was "a bad sire". The unusually feminine sounding name for a stallion appears to be from a variety of azalea created in 1912 whose flowers are "moderate yellow, tinted pink externally". Lemonora is immortalised in the 
1935 Alfred Hitchcock film The 39 Steps when the names of the first three horses in the 1921 Derby are recounted on stage by "Mr Memory".

External links
For movie footage of Lemonora winning the Grand Prix and Watson with his horse in the winner's enclosure, see British Pathe; you tube Item title reads: "World's Richest Racing Prize. "Lemonora" wins Grand Prix for Mr "Lucky" Watson"

References

Racehorses bred in the Kingdom of Great Britain